Alyssa Jane Amor Ube (born August 5, 1998) is a Filipino footballer who plays as a midfielder for UP Fighting Maroons women's football team and the Philippines women's national team.

International career

Philippines
Ube received her first senior call-up for the Philippines in the 2022 AFC Women's Asian Cup qualifiers. She made her senior international debut in a 2–1 win against Hong Kong.

Honours

International

Philippines 

 AFF Women's Championship: 2022

References

Living people
1998 births
Filipino women's footballers
Women's association football midfielders
Philippines women's international footballers